Chris Cranston (born September 14, 1946, in Santa Monica, California) is an American model and actress.  She is best known for being Playboy magazine's Playmate of the Month for its April 1971 issue. Her centerfold was photographed by Mario Casilli.

Cranston had small parts in the 1965 film Beach Blanket Bingo and the 1968 musical Funny Girl.  In 1967, she appeared on the front, back, and inside cover of a record jacket for the album Golden Greats by The Ventures.  She had appeared in the September 1968 issue of Playboy in the "Girls of Funny Girl" pictorial. She also a regular on the syndicated Playboy After Dark program.  In 1977 she was a winning contestant on Match Game.

See also
 List of people in Playboy 1970–1979

References

External links
 
 

1970s Playboy Playmates
Actresses from Santa Monica, California
1946 births
Living people
20th-century American actresses
21st-century American women